Paramsacta marginata, also called Donovan's tiger moth or Donovan's amsacta, is a moth of the family Erebidae. It is found in most of Australia, New Guinea, Fergusson Island and the Louisiade Archipelago. The species was first described by Edward Donovan in 1805.

The larvae feed on Asteraceae, Boraginaceae, Euphorbiaceae, Fabaceae, Plantaginaceae, Polygonaceae and Portulacaceae species.

References

Spilosomina
Moths described in 1805
Moths of Australia